Hélène Hillion-Guillemin (born 2 January 1969) is a French football player who played as Defender for French club Juvisy of the Division 1 Féminine. Guillemin won 6 Division 1 Féminine titles.

International career

Hélène Hillion represented France 62 times and scored once. Guillemin was also part of the French team at the 1997 European Championships.

Honours

Official
Division 1 Féminine (Champions of France) (level 1)
Winners (4): 1987–88, 1989–90, 1991–92, 1993–94

References

1969 births
Living people
People from Brittany
French women's footballers
France women's international footballers
Paris FC (women) players
Women's association football defenders
Division 1 Féminine players